Aspergillus foetidus is a species of fungus in the genus Aspergillus.

References

foetidus
Fungi described in 1945
Taxa named by Charles Thom